Alice Donnelly Madden (born December 9, 1958) is a politician from Colorado and member of the Democratic party. From 2001 to 2009, she served in the Colorado House of Representatives, representing the 10th district around Boulder. From 2005 to 2009, she served as Majority Leader.

Among the first bills Madden sponsored after being sworn in as a member of the Colorado General Assembly was a measure to require health insurance policies to include language indicating that the Colorado Insurance Commissioner has regulatory authority over such policies. During that 2001 session Madden also sponsored a bill that addressed the recycling of cathode-ray tube products. That bill was signed into law by the governor on June 6, 2001.

During the 2005 session of the legislature Madden sponsored a bill that would have amended the Colorado Anti-Discrimination Act to prohibit employment discrimination on the basis of sexual orientation and gender variance. Gov. Bill Owens vetoed the bill after it cleared both chambers of the legislature.

Between 2009 and 2011, Madden served as climate advisor and deputy chief of staff to Colorado governor Bill Ritter, and then, between 2013 and 2015, as principal deputy assistant secretary for intergovernmental and external affairs at the U.S. Department of Energy.

In 2016, she was a candidate for the University of Colorado Board of Regents, but she lost to Republican Heidi Ganahl in a close, 52%-48% race. Madden ran in the Democratic primary in the 2020 United States Senate election in Colorado, but she withdrew after former Governor John Hickenlooper joined the race.

References

External links 
 Alice Madden at ballotpedia.org
 Alice Madden at votesmart.org

1958 births
20th-century American lawyers
21st-century American politicians
21st-century American women politicians
Colorado lawyers
Living people
Democratic Party members of the Colorado House of Representatives
Politicians from Boulder, Colorado
University of Colorado Law School alumni
Women state legislators in Colorado
Candidates in the 2020 United States elections
20th-century American women lawyers